The Tanzer 29 is a Canadian sailboat, that was designed by the French company of Joubert-Nivelt and first built in 1986.

Production
Production of the boat was commenced in 1986 by Tanzer Industries of Dorion, Quebec. The company entered bankruptcy in May of that same year and production ended.

Design

The Tanzer 29 is a small recreational keelboat, built predominantly of fibreglass, with wood trim. It has a masthead sloop rig, a spade-type rudder and a fixed fin keel or optionally, a shoal-draft keel.

The boat has a PHRF racing average handicap of 174 with a high of 177 and low of 171.

Variants
Tanzer 29
Tanzer 29 SD

See also

List of sailing boat types
Similar sailboats
Alberg 29
Bayfield 29 
C&C 29
Cal 29
Hunter 290
Island Packet 29
Mirage 29
Northwind 29
Prospect 900
Thames Marine Mirage 29
Watkins 29

References

External links

Keelboats
1980s sailboat type designs
Sailing yachts
Sailboat type designs by Joubert-Nivelt
Sailboat types built by Tanzer Industries